Valeria medico legale is an Italian crime television series.

Cast

Claudia Koll: Valeria Banzi
Giulio Base: Luca Leoni
Nando Gazzolo
Massimo Ciavarro
Blas Roca Rey
Camilla Filippi
Francesca Rettondini (season 2) 
Isa Barzizza  (season 2) 
Marino Masè (season 2)

See also
List of Italian television series

External links
 

Italian television series
2000 Italian television series debuts
2002 Italian television series debuts
Canale 5 original programming